The Economic Daily is a Chinese state-owned newspaper focusing on economic reports. Founded in Beijing on January 1, 1983, the newspaper is a deputy ministerial-level institution under the State Council. The newspaper is managed by the Central Propaganda Department of the Chinese Communist Party.

History 
In 1984, Deng Xiaoping wrote an inscription for the Economic Daily.

In October 2020, the United States Department of State designated the Economic Daily as a foreign mission of China.

Hoax 

On January 28, 1993, Economic Daily published an article entitled Can Water Really Become Gasoline? —— A Record of Private Entrepreneur Wang Hongcheng and His Invention  (水真能变成油吗?——记民营企业家王洪成与他的发明). The article, written by Economic Daily reporters Wu Hongbo (吴红博) and Liu Donghua (刘东华), praised the "invention" of Wang Hongcheng (王洪成) for transforming water into gasoline as "China's fifth greatest invention" (中国第五大发明) after the traditional Four Great Inventions. However, the water-to-gasoline technology (水变油技术) was later deemed a hoax and pseudoscience, and in 1998, its initiator, Wang Hongcheng, was sentenced to 10 years in prison.

References

External links 

 

Publications established in 1983
Daily newspapers published in China
Chinese-language newspapers (Simplified Chinese)
State media
Chinese Communist Party newspapers